Bebearia barce, the shining green forester, is a butterfly in the family Nymphalidae. It is found in Guinea, Sierra Leone, Liberia, Ivory Coast, Ghana, Nigeria, Cameroon, Equatorial Guinea, the Republic of the Congo, the Democratic Republic of the Congo and Uganda. The habitat consists of forests.

Adults are attracted to fallen fruit.

The larvae feed on Hypselodelphys species

Subspecies
Bebearia barce barce — Guinea, Sierra Leone, Liberia, Ivory Coast, Ghana
Bebearia barce maculata (Aurivillius, 1912) — Nigeria, Cameroon, Bioko, Congo, Uganda: Toro, Democratic Republic of the Congo: Ubangi, Mongala, Uele, north Kivu, Tshopo, Tshuapa, Equateur, Kasai, Sankuru and Lualaba

References

Butterflies described in 1847
barce